The Rwanda women's national basketball team represents Rwanda in international competitions. It is administrated by the Fédération Rwandaise de Basketball Amateur (FERWABA).

African Championship 
 2009 – 9th
 2011 – 9th
 2023 – Qualified

Head coach position
  Nenad Amanovic – 2011-2012

See also
 Rwanda women's national under-19 basketball team
 Rwanda women's national under-17 basketball team

References

External links
Rwanda Basketball Records at FIBA Archive
Presentation on Facebook

 
Women's national basketball teams